Mohamed Masmoudi (29 May 1925, – 7 November 2016) was a Tunisian politician who was the Minister of Foreign Affairs from 12 June 1970 until 14 January 1974. He died on 7 November 2016, aged 91.

References

1925 births
2016 deaths
Tunisian politicians
Foreign ministers of Tunisia